Joseph "Joey" Hansen (born August 13, 1979 in Bakersfield, California) is an American competition rower.  He represented the United States at the 2004 Summer Olympics in Athens, where he received a gold medal in men's eights.

References
 Two Former OSU Men's Rowers Competing For U.S. Teams
 2004 Men's eight results
 
 Former OSU Standout Joey Hansen Named To U.S. Olympic Team
 Former OSU Rower Joey Hansen Wins Gold With U.S. Eight

External links
 
 

Olympic gold medalists for the United States in rowing
Rowers at the 2004 Summer Olympics
Living people
1979 births
American male rowers
Medalists at the 2004 Summer Olympics
World Rowing Championships medalists for the United States